Kerala has an urbanisation rate of 47.42%, as compared to the national rate of 31.16%, making it the 2nd most urbanised major state in India. Within Kerala, the rate of urbanisation varied from 3.9% in Wayanad district to 68.1% in Ernakulam district. Municipalities are the urban local governments that deal with civic functions and local development functions in the municipal area. The state of Kerala has 87 municipalities and six municipal corporations. With 13 municipalities, the district of Ernakulam has the most municipalities in the state.
{
  "type": "ExternalData",
  "service": "geoshape",
  "properties": {
    "stroke": "#ff0000",
    "stroke-width": 1
  },
  "query": "# Municipalities in Kerala\nSELECT ?id ?idLabel\n(concat('', ?idLabel, '') as ?title)\nWHERE\n{\n?id wdt:P31 wd:Q15284. # is a district\n?id wdt:P131* wd:Q1186. # in Kerala\nSERVICE wikibase:label { bd:serviceParam wikibase:language 'en'}\n}"}

History
The urban councils of Kerala date back to the 17th century when the Dutch Malabar established the municipality of Fort Kochi. 
In 1664, the municipality of Fort Kochi was established by Dutch Malabar, making it the first municipality in Indian subcontinent, which got dissolved when the Dutch authority got weaker in 18th century. However, the first modern kind of municipalities were formed in the state in 1866 in Malabar District. In 1866, Fort Kochi municipality was reestablished. Kannur, Thalassery, Kozhikode, Palakkad, and Fort Kochi, which were parts of Malabar District until 1956, were made the first modern municipalities of Kerala on 1 November 1866, according to the Madras Act 10 of 1865 (Amendment of the Improvements in Towns act 1850) of the British Indian Empire.

Enactment of the 74th Constitutional Amendment Act, 1992 
The 74th Constitutional Amendment Act, 1992 provided for a national framework for municipal governance in the country, and Kerala has been following that pattern since 1994. Consequent to this amendment, several changes have occurred in the functions, powers, and responsibilities of the municipalities, and the states had to make necessary amendments to the legislation on the local governments in the respective states. The Kerala Municipalities Act of 1994, enacted as per the constitutional amendment, governs the pattern, functions and services of the municipalities in Kerala. The act, which was integrated for the municipalities and corporations in the state, laid out the constitution of the town panchayats, municipal councils, and municipal corporations.

Prior to this, the urban areas of Kerala were governed by the following acts, which were repealed when the Kerala Municipality Act, 1994 was introduced:

 Kerala Municipalities Act, 1960 
 Kerala Municipal Corporations Act, 1961
 Guruvayur Township Act, 1960 

Hence, instead of having separate acts for municipal corporations and other types of municipal bodies, from 1994 Kerala has the same act to govern all its municipal bodies. Since then, the structure of municipal bodies has essentially remained the same, even though the urban areas have multiplied. The 74th amendment to the Constitution of India resulted in increased roles for the municipalities in every state in India, where they have been perceived to be great contributors to the social and economic development of the country, as they are the level of government that is closest to the citizens.

Structure
The Kerala Municipality Act 1994 envisage creation of three kinds of urban local governments
 Town panchayats for transitional areas.
 Municipalities for less urbanised areas and
 Municipal corporations for more urbanised areas.
Kerala has not created any town panchayats so far.

Functions
The functions of the Municipalities are enlisted as schedule appended to Kerala Municipality Act. The functions can be divided into civic functions and development functions in areas of agriculture, industry, health, education etc.

Functionaries
Chairperson is the executive authority of the municipalities. Elected councillors and officers are the other functionaries. Two types of officers now exist – officers belonging to the municipality as full-time officers and officers transferred to the municipality from the state government. H

Ward committees 
The Kerala Municipality Act, 1994 mandates the establishment of ward committees in each ward of the municipality. In case the municipality has less than one lakh population, then every person from the ward on the electoral roll becomes a member of the committee. In case the population of the municipality is more than one lakh, then the following become the members of the ward committee:

 the Councillor of the ward;
 fifteen persons to be elected in the manner prescribed, from among the members of the resident's association of that Ward, which are registered in the Municipality; 
 twenty members to be elected in the manner prescribed from among the members of the registered neighbourhood groups of that Ward which are registered in the Municipality; 
 one person each nominated by every political party having representation in the Municipality; 
 the Heads of all recognised educational institutions functioning in that Ward; 
 twenty persons nominated jointly by the Chairperson and Councillor of the Ward

In both cases, the local Councillor is the chairperson of the Ward Committee. The Kerala Municipality (Constitution of Ward Committee and Procedure for Meeting) Rules, 1995 provides further rules for the setting up and functioning of these committees. Ward Committees have been set up in Kerala and are regularly cited as a good example of functioning micro level urban governance in India. Ward Committees played an important role in combating the spread of COVID19 in Kerala.

Municipalities in Kerala

References

External links
 Website of Local Self Government Department in Kerala
 Local Self Government

See also
 Corporations, Municipalities and Taluks of Kerala
 Local Governance in Kerala
 Municipal Governance in India
 Non-Municipal Census Towns in Kerala

 
Populated places in Kerala